Henry C. "Hank" Foley is the current president of New York Institute of Technology, serving since June 1, 2017.

Education
Foley earned a bachelor's degree in chemistry at Providence College, a master's degree in chemistry from Purdue University, and doctorate in physical and inorganic chemistry from Penn State.

Academic work and career
Foley was most recently the interim chancellor of the University of Missouri, appointed on Nov. 10, 2015. Formerly, he was executive vice president for academic affairs for the UM System. Foley also served as vice president at Penn State and dean of Penn State's College of Information Sciences and Technology, and has held the positions of named chair, department head, associate vice president for research, and director of strategic initiatives at Penn State. While at Penn State, he was director of the Energy Efficient Buildings Hub, which was determined to be "poorly managed and lacked measurable goals" by the U.S. Senate Appropriations Committee, though (according to an interview with Foley) in its first year the EEB Hub had "developed cloud infrastructure and a web-based information portal for high resolution building energy data, launched the School District of Philadelphia Sustainability Workshop providing project-based learning for 30 high school seniors, and established partnerships with regional and national allies, including the Greater Philadelphia Chamber of Commerce." In addition, he has held faculty appointments at the University of Delaware.

Foley holds 16 patents for his research and has written more than 150 articles. He authored Introduction to Chemical Engineering Analysis Using Mathematica (1st Edition), a textbook published by Academic Press in 2002. On April 11, 2018, Scientific American published his op-ed, “Many Scientific Studies Are Bogus, but Blockchain Can Help.” 

Foley also serves on the Board of Trustees at Providence College, the Commission on Independent Colleges & Universities in New York, Lincoln Square Business Improvement District. and the Long Island Regional Advisory Council on Higher Education  In 2019, he received a Long Island Business News Executive Circle Award. Foley has been recognized as a fellow of the American Institute of Chemical Engineers, the Industrial and Engineering Chemistry Division of the American Chemical Society, the American Association for the Advancement of Science, and the National Academy of Inventors.

NYIT presidency
The Board of Trustees of New York Institute of Technology (NYIT) announced on March 29, 2017 the appointment of Foley as the new president of NYIT, effective June 1, 2017. The installation ceremony took place on April 12, 2018.

References

Year of birth missing (living people)
Living people
New York Institute of Technology faculty
Presidents of New York Institute of Technology
Leaders of the University of Missouri